Santiago Yusta García (born April 28, 1997) is a Spanish professional basketball player for Casademont Zaragoza of the Liga ACB.

Professional career 
After coming through the youth ranks of Club Baloncesto Torrejón and Real Madrid, Yusta made his debut for Real’s second men’s team in the fourth-tier of Spanish basketball, EBA, during the 2013-14 season. In the course of the 2014-15 season, he logged his first minutes in the ACB, Spain’s top league, and helped Real’s youth squad win the 2015 Euroleague Next Generation Tournament title.

In July 2015, he moved from Madrid to fellow ACB outfit Obradoiro, signing a three-year deal with the club. In his first season with Obradoiro, he was named to the All-ACB Best Young Players Team.

In July 2017, Yusta signed a two-year deal with Real Madrid.

On July 13, 2019, Yusta signed a two-year deal with Spanish club Iberostar Tenerife.

On July 6, 2021, he has signed with Casademont Zaragoza of the Liga ACB.

National team career 
Yusta made nine appearances for the Spanish under-16 national team, averaging 13.3 points, 5.2 rebounds, 2.0 assists and 2.1 steals a contest, as they captured the European championship in 2013. In 2014, he led the Spanish under-17 national team to the semifinals at the World Championships, putting up averages of 14.1 points and 3.9 boards per outing. Yusta also played for Spain at the U18 European Championships in 2015 and was a key-part of the team that won gold at the 2016 U20 European Championships. He scored 10.7 points per contest during the tournament, while pulling down 5.4 rebounds a game, dishing out 2.4 assists and snagging 2.1 steals per outing.
On July 1, 2018, Yusta made his debut with the Spanish national team with a 80-60 victory over Belarus scoring 4 points and dishing out 2 assists in 10 minutes.

References

External links 
 Profile at realmadrid.com
 Profile at eurobasket.com
 Profile at acb.com
 Profile at competiciones.feb.es

1997 births
Living people
Basketball players from Madrid
Basket Zaragoza players
CB Canarias players
Liga ACB players
Obradoiro CAB players
Real Madrid Baloncesto players
Small forwards
Spanish men's basketball players